The Aeglidae are a family of freshwater crustaceans currently restricted to South America. They are the only anomurans to be found in fresh water except for a single hermit crab species, Clibanarius fonticola, on Espiritu Santo, Vanuatu.

Description
Aeglids resemble squat lobsters in that the abdomen is partly tucked under the thorax. The notable sexual dimorphism in the abdomen is related to the behaviour of carrying fertilised eggs on the pleopods. The carapace length of the largest species may approach , but most are considerably smaller.

Aeglids are omnivorous, preferring plant matter, but also eating adult insects, molluscs, fish and fly larvae.

The internal anatomy has been described for Aegla cholchol and generally resembles that of other anomurans, particularly galatheoid squat lobsters. The morphology of the antennal gland bladder differs from that in other anomurans in having a twisted tubular structure which was interpreted as an adaption to the freshwater lifestyle.

Life cycle
Mating is preceded by a period of courtship, and does not coincide with moulting, as it does in many other decapods. The eggs of aeglids hatch as juveniles which closely resemble the adults. They are cared for by their parents and live at the bottom of the body of water.

Extant taxa
Aegla, the only extant genus in the family, contains around 74 described extant species. Of the 63 species and subspecies described by 2008, two are found in lakes, four in caves, and the remaining 57 are found mainly in rivers. 42 species are found in Brazil, all restricted to the country's southern and southeastern regions (Rio Grande do Sul alone is home to 24). Other countries with species are Argentina, Bolivia, Chile, Paraguay and Uruguay. More than a third of the species are considered threatened, and in Brazil alone 26 species are officially recognized as threatened, including 8 critically endangered.

Species
This list contains all the described species :

Aegla abtao Schmitt, 1942
Aegla affinis Schmitt, 1942
Aegla alacalufi Jara & López, 1981
Aegla araucaniensis Jara, 1980
Aegla bahamondei Jara, 1982
Aegla brevipalma Bond-Buckup & Santos in Santos et al., 2012
Aegla camargoi Buckup & Rossi, 1977
Aegla castro Schmitt, 1942
Aegla cavernicola Türkay, 1972
Aegla cholchol Jara & Palacios, 1999
Aegla concepcionensis Schmitt, 1942
Aegla denticulata Nicolet, 1849
Aegla expansa Jara, 1992
Aegla franca Schmitt, 1942
Aegla franciscana Buckup & Rossi, 1977
Aegla georginae Santos & Jara in Santos et al., 2013
Aegla grisella Bond-Buckup & Buckup, 1994
Aegla hueicollensis Jara & Palacios, 1999
Aegla humahuaca Schmitt, 1942
Aegla inconspicua Bond-Buckup & Buckup, 1994
Aegla inermis Bond-Buckup & Buckup, 1994
Aegla intercalata Bond-Buckup & Buckup, 1994
Aegla intermedia Girard, 1855
Aegla itacolomiensis Bond-Buckup & Buckup, 1994
Aegla jarai Bond-Buckup & Buckup, 1994
Aegla jujuyana Schmitt, 1942
Aegla laevis (Latreille, 1818)
Aegla lata Bond-Buckup & Buckup, 1994
Aegla leachi Bond-Buckup & Buckup in Santos et al., 2012
Aegla leptochela Bond-Buckup & Buckup, 1994
Aegla leptodactyla Buckup & Rossi, 1977
Aegla ligulata Bond-Buckup & Buckup, 1994
Aegla longirostri Bond-Buckup & Buckup, 1994
Aegla ludwigi Santos & Jara in Santos et al., 2013
Aegla manni Jara, 1980
Aegla marginata Bond-Buckup & Buckup, 1994
Aegla manuniflata Bond-Buckup & Santos in Santos et al., 2009
Aegla microphthalma Bond-Buckup & Buckup, 1994
Aegla muelleri Bond-Buckup & Buckup in Bond-Buckup et al., 2010
Aegla neuquensis Schmitt, 1942
Aegla oblata Bond-Buckup & Santos in Santos et al., 2012
Aegla obstipa Bond-Buckup & Buckup, 1994
Aegla occidentalis Jara, Pérez-Losada & Crandall, 2003
Aegla odebrechtii Müller, 1876
Aegla papudo Schmitt, 1942
Aegla parana Schmitt, 1942
Aegla parva Bond-Buckup & Buckup, 1994
Aegla paulensis Schmitt, 1942
Aegla perobae Hebling & Rodrigues, 1977
Aegla pewenchae Jara, 1994
Aegla plana Buckup & Rossi, 1977
Aegla platensis Schmitt, 1942
Aegla pomerana Bond-Buckup & Buckup in Bond-Buckup et al., 2010
Aegla prado Schmitt, 1942
Aegla renana Bond-Buckup & Santos in Santos et al., 2010
Aegla ringueleti Bond-Buckup & Buckup, 1994
Aegla riolimayana Schmitt, 1942
Aegla rossiana Bond-Buckup & Buckup, 1994
Aegla rostrata Jara, 1977
Aegla saltensis Bond-Buckup & Jara in Bond-Buckup et al., 2010
Aegla sanlorenzo Schmitt, 1942
Aegla scamosa Ringuelet, 1948
Aegla schmitti Hobbs III, 1979
Aegla septentrionalis Bond-Buckup & Buckup, 1994
Aegla serrana Buckup & Rossi, 1977
Aegla singularis Ringuelet, 1948
Aegla spectabilis Jara, 1986
Aegla spinipalma Bond-Buckup & Buckup, 1994
Aegla spinosa Bond-Buckup & Buckup, 1994
Aegla strinatii Türkay, 1972
Aegla talcahuano Schmitt, 1942
Aegla uruguayana Schmitt, 1942
Aegla violacea Bond-Buckup & Buckup, 1994

Fossil taxa

Haumuriaegla
Haumuriaegla glaessneri is a species known only from fossils of Haumurian age (Late Cretaceous) found near Cheviot, New Zealand. At the time of its discovery, Haumuriaegla was the only known fossil from the family and the only marine member.

Protaegla
Protaegla miniscula was discovered in rocks of Albian age from the Tlayúa Formation, near Tepexi de Rodríguez, Mexico.

Evolution
The family as a whole is thought to have originated around 75 million years ago in a marine environment, and then entered South America from the Pacific side during the Oligocene.

References

External links

Anomura
Freshwater crustaceans of South America
Extant Albian first appearances
Decapod families
Taxa named by James Dwight Dana